Chafik Najih (born August 5, 1983 in Bourgoin-Jallieu) is a French professional footballer who played in Ligue 1 for Arles-Avignon.

References

People from Bourgoin-Jallieu
1983 births
Living people
French sportspeople of Moroccan descent
French footballers
Ligue 1 players
Ligue 2 players
AC Arlésien players
Clermont Foot players
Association football forwards
Sportspeople from Isère
Footballers from Auvergne-Rhône-Alpes